Michael J. Squier (born May 17, 1946) is a retired United States Army Brigadier General who served as Deputy Director of the Army National Guard.

Early life
Michael J. Squier was born in Boise, Idaho, on May 17, 1946.  He enlisted in the Idaho Army National Guard in 1963, and graduated from Borah High School in 1964.

Start of military career
Squier received his commission after completing Officer Candidate School in 1965.  He advanced through several assignments in Idaho, including platoon leader with the 116th Ordnance Company; Tactical Officer at the Idaho Military Academy; Platoon Leader and later Commander of the 116th Heavy Equipment Maintenance Company; and Commandant of the Idaho Military Academy.

Later military career
In 1978 Squier became a full-time member of the National Guard and was assigned as a Staff Officer in the National Guard Bureau’s Mobilization Readiness Division.  He subsequently served as Assistant Executive to the Chief of the National Guard Bureau.

In 1986 Squier received a Bachelor of Science degree in Business Management from the University of Maryland, and he completed the United States Army War College in 1987.

From July, 1987 to November, 1988 was Commander of the 145th Support Battalion, a unit of the 116th Cavalry Brigade.  From November, 1988 to May, 1991 he was Commander of the Equipment Maintenance Center for the 29th Area Support Group, a subordinate command of United States Army Europe.

From May to November, 1991 Squier was Deputy Chief of Public Affairs at the National Guard Bureau.  From November, 1991 to September, 1995 he served as Chief of the Readiness Division at NGB.

Squier served as Executive Officer to the Chief of the National Guard Bureau from September, 1995 to September, 1996.  He was assigned as Chief of Staff at the National Guard Bureau from September, 1996 to February, 1998.

In February, 1998 Squier was appointed Deputy Director of the Army National Guard and promoted to Brigadier General.  He served until retiring in September, 2002.

Military education
In addition to being a graduate of the University of Maryland and the Army War College, Squier completed: the Maintenance Officer Management Course; Infantry Officer Advanced Course, and United States Army Command and General Staff College.

Post military career
Squier has been employed by defense contractors in the Washington, D.C. area, including CACI.
He resides in Manassas, Virginia.

Awards and decorations
General Squier has received the following awards:

Additional awards
Squier is a recipient of the National Infantry Association’s Order of Saint Maurice (Primicerius).

Chronological list of assignments
September, 1965 – April, 1969, Platoon Leader, 116th Ordnance Company, Boise, Idaho
May, 1969 – July, 1971, Tactical Officer, Idaho Military Academy, Idaho Army National Guard, Boise, Idaho
August, 1971 – September, 1977, Platoon Leader, later Commander, 116th Heavy Equipment Maintenance Company, Boise, Idaho
September, 1977 – March, 1978, Commandant, Idaho Military Academy, Idaho Army National Guard, Boise, Idaho
March, 1978 – November, 1982, Staff Officer, National Guard Bureau, Mobilization Readiness Division, Washington, D.C.
November, 1982 – June, 1986, Assistant Executive to Chief, National Guard Bureau, Washington, DC
July, 1986 – July, 1987, Student, Army War College, Carlisle Barracks, Pennsylvania
July, 1987 – November, 1988, Commander, 145th Support Battalion, 116th Cavalry Brigade
November, 1988 – May, 1991, Commander, Equipment Maintenance Center, 29th Area Support Group, United States Army Europe
May, 1991 – October, 1991, Deputy Chief, Public Affairs, National Guard Bureau, Arlington, Virginia 
November, 1991 – September, 1995, Chief, Readiness Division, Army National Guard Readiness Center, Arlington, Virginia
September, 1995 – September, 1996, Executive Officer to the Chief, National Guard Bureau, Washington, DC
September, 1996 – February, 1998, Chief of Staff, Army National Guard, The Pentagon, Washington, D.C. 
March, 1998 – September, 2002, Deputy Director, Army National Guard, Arlington, Virginia

Effective dates of promotions
Brigadier General, March 1, 1998
Colonel, April 1, 1991
Lieutenant Colonel, December 10, 1984
Major, February 25, 1980
Captain, February 26, 1972
First Lieutenant, September 22, 1968
Second Lieutenant, September 23, 1965

References

Living people
1946 births
People from Boise, Idaho
University of Maryland, College Park alumni
United States Army Command and General Staff College alumni
United States Army War College alumni
Recipients of the Legion of Merit
United States Army generals
National Guard (United States) generals